Khalid Ali Matar (Arabic:خالد علي مطر) (born 26 July 1989) is an Emirati footballer. He currently plays as a left back for Al Dhaid .

Career
Khalid Ali started his career at Al-Nasr and is a product of the Al-Nasr's youth system, and after then played for Hatta, Masfout, and Al Dhaid .

External links

References

1989 births
Living people
Emirati footballers
Emirati people of Baloch descent
Al-Nasr SC (Dubai) players
Hatta Club players
Masfout Club players
Al Dhaid SC players
UAE Pro League players
UAE First Division League players
Association football fullbacks
Place of birth missing (living people)